Charles Kane (born 2 July 1968) is a British boxer. He fought as Charlie Kane and competed in the men's lightweight event at the 1988 Summer Olympics.

He won the 1988 Amateur Boxing Association British lightweight title, when boxing out of the Antonine ABC. Two years later he won the gold medal in the Boxing at the 1990 Commonwealth Games.

References

External links
 

1968 births
Living people
Scottish male boxers
British male boxers
Olympic boxers of Great Britain
Boxers at the 1988 Summer Olympics
Boxers from Glasgow
Commonwealth Games medallists in boxing
Boxers at the 1990 Commonwealth Games
Commonwealth Games gold medallists for Scotland
Lightweight boxers
Medallists at the 1990 Commonwealth Games